Mangatarem, officially the Municipality of Mangatarem, is a 1st class municipality in the province of Pangasinan, Philippines. According to the 2020 census, it has a population of 79,323 people.

Mangatarem is a Pangasinan word for "mango plantation". The town's name also came from the Ilocano Phrase “mangga ken tirem” which means "mango and oyster".
 
The Municipality is home to the Manleluag Hot Spring Protected Landscape located in Barangay Malabobo near the southern boundary of the municipality.

In terms of economic activities, Mangatarem is primarily driven by agriculture. The municipality has the biggest land area in the entire Pangasinan province. A big percentage of its households also have family members who are working or have migrated abroad.

The town's poblacion area continues to attract major food, retail, and service establishments from Metro Manila and nearby cities within the province of Pangasinan. The more popular retail and food include Magic Group of Companies (Magic Mall), CSI Supermarket, Puregold, McDonald's,  Jollibee, Mang Inasal, 7-Eleven, and Mercury Drug, among many others. Service establishments include banks, courier, pawnshops, auto/motorcycle service shops, These include Metrobank, Land Bank of the Philippines, and many others.

The town's public market serves not only the local residents but also the residents and farmers or entrepreneurs from the adjoining towns of Urbiztondo, Aguilar, and San Clemente, Tarlac, especially on weekends. This is one of the reasons that major commercial establishments started to take notice of the municipality and decided to set up their branches here.

Geography

Barangays
Mangatarem is politically subdivided into 86 barangays. These barangays are headed by elected officials: Barangay Captain, Barangay Council, whose members are called Barangay Councilors. All are elected every three years.

Climate

Demographics

Economy

Government
Mangatarem, belonging to the second congressional district of the province of Pangasinan, is governed by a mayor designated as its local chief executive and by a municipal council as its legislative body in accordance with the Local Government Code. The mayor, vice mayor, and the councilors are elected directly by the people through an election which is being held every three years.

Elected officials

Tourism
St. Raymond of Peñafort Parish Church (Mangatarem)
Manleluag Hot Spring Resort & Protected Landscape
Immaltar Hot Spring
Kanding Waterfalls (Canding Falls)
Tangguyob Waterfalls (Timangguyob Falls)
Pacalat Impounding Dam
Daang Kalikasan

Mangatarem's tourist attractions are mostly natural (hot springs, waterfalls). These are frequented by local tourists during weekends and especially during summer. A number of local property owners have also developed their own pocket resorts outside of the poblacion area and opened these to the general public.

Government
Mangatarem, belonging to the second congressional district of the province of Pangasinan, is governed by a mayor designated as its local chief executive and by a municipal council as its legislative body in accordance with the Local Government Code. The mayor, vice mayor, and the councilors are elected directly by the people through an election which is being held every three years.

References

External links

 Mangatarem Profile at PhilAtlas.com
 Municipal Profile at the National Competitiveness Council of the Philippines
 Mangatarem at the Pangasinan Government Website
 Local Governance Performance Management System
 [ Philippine Standard Geographic Code]
 Philippine Census Information

Municipalities of Pangasinan
Populated places on the Agno River